The 2015–16 Memphis Grizzlies season was the 21st season of the franchise in the National Basketball Association (NBA). While the team was able to make the postseason, they were affected by several injuries and were swept by the San Antonio Spurs in the First Round, the team that also swept them in the First Round of the 2004 Playoffs and the Western Conference Finals of the 2013 Playoffs.

Dave Joerger was fired immediately after the end of the series, hearing of his firing after a tearful press conference.

Draft

Roster

Game log

Preseason

|- style="background:#bfb;"
| 1 || October 6 || Houston
| 92–89
| Russ Smith (12)
| Marc Gasol (8)
| JaMychal Green (3)
| FedExForum12,826
| 1–0
|- style="background:#bfb;"
| 2 || October 8 || Maccabi Haifa
| 97–84
| Marc Gasol (23)
| Brandan Wright (9)
| Barnes, Gasol, Green, Udrih (3)
| FedExForum12,171
| 2–0
|- style="background:#bfb;"
| 3 || October 12 || @ Cleveland
| 91–81
| Zach Randolph (14)
| Courtney Lee (6)
| Mike Conley (9)
| Schottenstein Center18,073
| 3–0
|- style="background:#bfb;"
| 4 || October 16 || Oklahoma City
| 94–78
| Ryan Hollins (16)
| Jarnell Stokes (10)
| Green, Smith (4)
| FedEx Forum14,996
| 4–0
|- style="background:#bfb;"
| 5 || October 18 || Minnesota
| 90–68
| Courtney Lee (18)
| Marc Gasol (8)
| Russ Smith (4)
| FedExForum13,387
| 5–0
|- style="background:#bfb;"
| 6 || October 21 || @ Atlanta
| 82–81
| Zach Randolph (19)
| Zach Randolph (13)
| Mike Conley (5)
| Philips Arena11,273
| 6–0
|- style="background:#fbb;"
| 7 || October 23 || @ Orlando
| 76–86
| Brandan Wright (11)
| Stokes, Wright (9)
| Jeff Green (4)
| Amway Center12,155
| 6–1

Regular season game log

|- style="background:#fbb;"
| 1
| October 28
| Cleveland
| 
| Gasol, Randolph (12)
| Zach Randolph (8)
| Mike Conley, Jr. (6)
| FedExForum18,119
| 0–1
|- style="background:#bfb;"
| 2
| October 29
| @ Indiana
| 
| Marc Gasol (20)
| Gasol, Randolph (8)
| Mike Conley, Jr. (10)
| Bankers Life Fieldhouse18,165
| 1–1
|- style="background:#bfb;"
| 3
| October 31
| Brooklyn
| 
| Mike Conley, Jr. (22)
| Zach Randolph (13)
| Mike Conley, Jr. (8)
| FedExForum16,013
| 2–1

|- style="background:#fbb;"
| 4
| November 2
| @ Golden State
| 
| Marc Gasol (13)
| Marc Gasol (9)
| Mike Conley, Jr. (5)
| Oracle Arena19,596
| 2–2
|- style="background:#bfb;"
| 5
| November 3
| @ Sacramento
| 
| Zach Randolph (20)
| Zach Randolph (11)
| Mike Conley, Jr. (6)
| Sleep Train Arena17,317
| 3–2
|- style="background:#fbb;"
| 6
| November 5
| @ Portland
| 
| Courtney Lee (18)
| Zach Randolph (10)
| Beno Udrih (6)
| Moda Center19,393
| 3–3
|- style="background:#fbb;"
| 7
| November 7
| @ Utah
| 
| Mike Conley, Jr. (20)
| Marc Gasol (10)
| Marc Gasol (6)
| Vivint Smart Home Arena19,456
| 3–4
|- style="background:#fbb;"
| 8
| November 9
| @ L.A. Clippers
| 
| Zach Randolph (26)
| Zach Randolph (9)
| Conley, Jr., Lee (5)
| Staples Center19,060
| 3–5
|- style="background:#fbb;"
| 9
| November 11
| Golden State
| 
| Marc Gasol (26)
| JaMychal Green (9)
| Mike Conley, Jr. (9)
| FedExForum18,119
| 3–6
|- style="background:#bfb;"
| 10
| November 13
| Portland
| 
| Marc Gasol (31)
| Zach Randolph (8)
| Mike Conley, Jr. (9)
| FedExForum18,119
| 4–6
|- style="background:#bfb;"
| 11
| November 15
| @ Minnesota
| 
| Jeff Green (21)
| Zach Randolph (8)
| Mike Conley, Jr. (7)
| Target Center12,086
| 5–6
|- style="background:#bfb;"
| 12
| November 16
| Oklahoma City
| 
| Mike Conley, Jr. (22)
| Zach Randolph (10)
| Mike Conley, Jr. (9)
| FedExForum17,270
| 6–6
|- style="background:#bfb;"
| 13
| November 20
| Houston
| 
| Mike Conley, Jr. (26)
| Marc Gasol (11)
| Marc Gasol (11)
| FedExForum17,555
| 7–6
|- style="background:#fbb;"
| 14
| November 21
| @ San Antonio
| 
| Mike Conley, Jr. (16)
| Marc Gasol (8)
| Marc Gasol (6)
| AT&T Center18,418
| 7–7
|- style="background:#bfb;"
| 15
| November 24
| Dallas
| 
| Mike Conley, Jr. (21)
| Marc Gasol (10)
| Mike Conley, Jr. (6)
| FedExForum17,381
| 8–7
|- style="background:#bfb;"
| 16
| November 25
| @ Houston
| 
| Jeff Green (20)
| Gasol, Green (7)
| Chalmers, Conley, Jr. (5)
| Toyota Center18,143
| 9–7
|- style="background:#fbb;"
| 17
| November 27
| Atlanta
| 
| Mike Conley, Jr. (16)
| Marc Gasol (8)
| Mike Conley, Jr. (9)
| FedExForum17,684
| 9–8
|- style="background:#bfb;"
| 18
| November 29
| Philadelphia
| 
| Mike Conley, Jr. (20)
| Marc Gasol (12)
| Chalmers, Conley, Jr. (5)
| FedExForum15,322
| 10–8

|- style="background:#bfb;"
| 19
| December 1
| @ New Orleans
| 
| Marc Gasol (38)
| Marc Gasol (13)
| Marc Gasol (6)
| Smoothie King Center16,020
| 11–8
|- style="background:#fbb;"
| 20
| December 3
| San Antonio
| 
| Chalmers, Conley, Jr., Gasol (15)
| Marc Gasol (8)
| Mike Conley, Jr. (4)
| FedExForum17,013
| 11–9
|- style="background:#bfb;"
| 21
| December 6
| Phoenix
| 
| Marc Gasol (22)
| Zach Randolph (9)
| Conley, Jr., Lee (6)
| FedExForum16,022
| 12–9
|- style="background:#fbb;"
| 22
| December 8
| Oklahoma City
| 
| Mario Chalmers (19)
| Zach Randolph (10)
| Mike Conley, Jr. (6)
| FedExForum16,415
| 12–10
|- style="background:#bfb;"
| 23
| December 9
| @ Detroit
| 
| Zach Randolph (26)
| Zach Randolph (16)
| Mike Conley, Jr. (8)
| Palace of Auburn Hills13,411
| 13–10
|- style="background:#fbb;"
| 24
| December 11
| Charlotte
| 
| Marc Gasol (17)
| Marc Gasol (9)
| Marc Gasol (5)
| FedExForum17,111
| 13–11
|- style="background:#fbb;"
| 25
| December 13
| @ Miami
| 
| Jeff Green (26)
| Matt Barnes (13)
| Barnes, Conley, Gasol, Randolph (4)
| AmericanAirlines Arena19,813
| 13–12
|- style="background:#bfb;"
| 26
| December 14
| Washington
| 
| Marc Gasol (24)
| Marc Gasol (12)
| Mike Conley, Jr. (11)
| FedExForum15,397
| 14–12
|- style="background:#fbb;"
| 27
| December 16
| @ Chicago
| 
| Courtney Lee (18)
| Zach Randolph (11)
| Marc Gasol (7)
| United Center21,032
| 14–13
|- style="background:#fbb;"
| 28
| December 18
| @ Dallas
| 
| Mike Conley, Jr. (20)
| Gasol, Randolph (8)
| Jeff Green (3)
| American Airlines Center20,199
| 14–14
|- style="background:#bfb;"
| 29
| December 19
| Indiana
| 
| Mike Conley, Jr. (20)
| Marc Gasol (12)
| Jeff Green (8) 
| FedExForum18,119
| 15–14
|- style="background:#bfb;"
| 30
| December 22
| @ Philadelphia
| 
| Marc Gasol (18)
| Matt Barnes (10)
| Mario Chalmers (7)
| Wells Fargo Center15,552
| 16–14
|- style="background:#fbb;"
| 31
| December 23
| @ Washington
| 
| Mike Conley, Jr. (21)
| Marc Gasol (12)
| Jeff Green (4)  
| Verizon Center15,879
| 16–15
|- style="background:#fbb;"
| 32
| December 26
| @ Charlotte
| 
| Mike Conley, Jr. (19)
| Zach Randolph (12)
| Mike Conley, Jr. (7)
| Time Warner Cable Arena19,091
| 16–16
|- style="background:#bfb;"
| 33
| December 27
| L. A. Lakers
| 
| Mike Conley, Jr. (19)
| Barnes, Green (8)
| Mario Chalmers (7)
| FedEx Forum18,119
| 17–16
|- style="background:#bfb;"
| 34
| December 29
| Miami
| 
| Marc Gasol (23)
| Marc Gasol (8)
| Marc Gasol (6)
| FedEx Forum18,119
| 18–16

|- style="background:#fbb;"
| 35
| January 2
| @ Utah
| 
| Marc Gasol (20)
| Jeff Green (10)
| Conley, Jr., Gasol (4)
| Vivint Smart Home Arena18,455
| 18–17
|- style="background:#bfb;"
| 36
| January 4
| @ Portland
| 
| Zach Randolph (26)
| Zach Randolph (18)
| Mario Chalmers (6)
| Moda Center18,832
| 19–17
|- style="background:#fbb;"
| 37
| January 6
| @ Oklahoma City
| 
| Mario Chalmers (23)
| Zach Randolph (8)
| Mario Chalmers (9)
| Chesapeake Energy Arena18,203
| 19–18
|- style="background:#bfb;"
| 38
| January 8
| Denver
| 
| Zach Randolph (24)
| Allen, Green (9)
| Mario Chalmers (4)
| FedExForum17,499
| 20–18
|- style="background:#bfb;"
| 39
| January 10
| Boston
| 
| Zach Randolph (25)
| Zach Randolph (13)
| Mario Chalmers (4)
| FedEx Forum17,112
| 21–18
|- style="background:#fbb;"
| 40
| January 12
| Houston
| 
| Marc Gasol (20)
| Zach Randolph (13)
| Mario Chalmers (9)
| FedEx Forum17,112
| 21–19
|- style="background:#bfb;"
| 41
| January 14
| Detroit
| 
| Mario Chalmers (25)
| Tony Allen (7)
| Mario Chalmers (8)
| FedEx Forum15,977
| 22–19
|- style="background:#bfb;"
| 42
| January 16
| New York
| 
| Marc Gasol (37)
| Tony Allen (9)
| Mario Chalmers (8)
| FedEx Forum18,119
| 23–19
|- style="background:#bfb;"
| 43
| January 18
| New Orleans
| 
| Barnes, Gasol, Green, Lee (16)
| Marc Gasol (10)
| Mike Conley, Jr. (10)
| FedEx Forum18,119
| 24–19
|- style="background:#bfb;"
| 44
| January 21
| @ Denver
| 
| Marc Gasol (27)
| Zach Randolph (7)
| Chalmers, Gasol (6)
| Pepsi Center16,140
| 25–19
|- style="background:#fbb;"
| 45
| January 23
| @ Minnesota
| 
| Mario Chalmers (19)
| Mike Conley, Jr. (7)
| Mike Conley, Jr. (6)
| Target Center15,608
| 25–20
|- style="background:#bfb;"
| 46
| January 25
| Orlando
| 
| Jeff Green (30)
| Zach Randolph (13)
| Mike Conley, Jr. (9)
| FedEx Forum15,779
| 26–20
|- style="background:#bfb;"
| 47
| January 28
| Milwaukee
| 
| Jeff Green (21)
| Marc Gasol (8)
| Mario Chalmers (10)
| FedEx Forum15,244
| 27–20
|- style="background:#bfb;"
| 48
| January 30
| Sacramento
| 
| Jeff Green (29)
| Marc Gasol (6) 
| Mike Conley, Jr. (7)
| FedEx Forum18,119
| 28–20

|- style="background:#bfb;"
| 49
| February 1
| @ New Orleans
|  
| Jeff Green (24)
| Zach Randolph (12)
| Mike Conley, Jr. (10)
| Smoothie King Center15,210
| 29–20
|- style="background:#bfb;"
| 50
| February 5
| @ New York
| 
| Jeff Green (16)
| Barnes, Gasol (7)
| Mike Conley, Jr. (9)
| Madison Square Garden19,812
| 30–20
|- style="background:#fbb;"
| 51
| February 6
| Dallas
|  
| Marc Gasol (22)
| Zach Randolph (14)
| Mike Conley, Jr. (7)
| FedExForum18,119
| 30–21
|- style="background:#fbb;"
| 52
| February 8
| Portland
| 
| Mike Conley, Jr. (27)
| Zach Randolph (9)
| Zach Randolph (4)
| FedExForum15,892
| 30–22
|- style="background:#bfb;"
| 53
| February 10
| @ Brooklyn
|  
| Mike Conley, Jr. (20)
| Allen, Chalmers (6)
| Zach Randolph (6)
| Barclays Center14,262
| 31–22
|- align="center"
| colspan="9" style="background:#bbcaff;" | All-Star Break
|- style="background:#bfb;"
| 54
| February 19
| Minnesota
| 
| Mike Conley, Jr. (25)
| Jeff Green (11)
| Mike Conley, Jr. (7)
| FedExForum18,119
| 32–22
|- style="background:#fbb;"
| 55
| February 21
| @ Toronto
| 
| Zach Randolph (18)
| Matt Barnes (7)
| Mike Conley, Jr. (4)
| Air Canada Centre19,800
| 32–23
|- style="background:#bfb;"
| 56
| February 24
| L. A. Lakers
| 
| Matt Barnes (25)
| Green, Randolph (9)
| Mike Conley, Jr. (8)
| FedExForum18,119
| 33–23
|- style="background:#bfb;"
| 57
| February 26
| @ L. A. Lakers
|  
| P.J. Hairston (21)
| Zach Randolph (10)
| Mike Conley, Jr. (7)
| Staples Center18,997
| 34–23
|- style="background:#fbb;"
| 58
| February 27
| @ Phoenix
| 
| Conley, Jr., Randolph (19)
| Chris Andersen (8)
| Mike Conley, Jr. (8)
| Talking Stick Resort Arena17,101
| 34–24
|- style="background:#bfb;"
| 59
| February 29
| @ Denver
| 
| Zach Randolph (22)
| Zach Randolph (5)
| Mike Conley, Jr. (9)
| Pepsi Center10,324
| 35–24

|- style="background:#bfb;"
| 60
| March 2
| Sacramento
| 
| Mike Conley, Jr. (24)
| Martin, Randolph (8)
| Mike Conley, Jr. (5)
| FedExForum15,310
| 36–24
|- style="background:#bfb;"
| 61
| March 4
| Utah
| 
| Zach Randolph (25)
| Chris Andersen (10)
| Mario Chalmers (5)
| FedExForum17,188
| 37–24
|- style="background:#fbb;"
| 62
| March 6
| Phoenix
| 
| Mike Conley, Jr. (22)
| Zach Randolph (8)
| Mike Conley, Jr. (4) 
| FedExForum17,291
| 37–25
|- style="background:#bfb;"
| 63
| March 7
| @ Cleveland
| 
| Tony Allen (26)
| Zach Randolph (10)
| Mario Chalmers (7)
| Quicken Loans Arena20,562
| 38–25
|- style="background:#fbb;"
| 64
| March 9
| @ Boston
| 
| Carter, Green (17)
| JaMychal Green (13)
| Mario Chalmers (5)
| TD Garden17,790
| 38–26
|- style="background:#bfb;"
| 65
| March 11
| New Orleans
| 
| Matt Barnes (26)
| Matt Barnes (11)
| Matt Barnes (10)
| FedExForum18,119
| 39–26
|- style="background:#fbb;"
| 66
| March 12
| @ Atlanta
| 
| Lance Stephenson (18)
| Tony Allen (9)
| Lance Stephenson (6)
| Philips Arena17,515
| 39–27
|- style="background:#fbb;"
| 67
| March 14
| @ Houston
| 
| Jarell Martin (17)
| Alex Stepheson (15)
| Ray McCallum (4)
| Toyota Center18,226
| 39–28
|- style="background:#fbb;"
| 68
| March 16
| Minnesota
| 
| Lance Stephenson (24)
| Lance Stephenson (11)
| Lance Stephenson (7)
| FedExForum16,588
| 39–29
|- style="background:#fbb;"
| 69
| March 17
| @ Milwaukee
|  
| Matt Barnes (26)
| Ryan Hollins (10)
| Lance Stephenson (6)
| BMO Harris Bradley Center11,740
| 39–30
|- style="background:#bfb;"
| 70
| March 19
| L. A. Clippers
|  
| Zach Randolph (28)
| Zach Randolph (11)
| Zach Randolph (10)
| FedExForum18,119
| 40–30
|- style="background:#bfb;"
| 71
| March 21
| @ Phoenix
| 
| Lance Stephenson (16)
| Zach Randolph (12)
| Ray McCallum (7)
| Talking Stick Resort Arena15,868
| 41–30
|- style="background:#fbb;"
| 72
| March 22
| @ L. A. Lakers
| 
| Tony Allen (27)
| Vince Carter (7)
| Allen, Farmar, Randolph (5)
| Staples Center18,997
| 41–31
|- style="background:#fbb;"
| 73
| March 25
| @ San Antonio
| 
| JaMychal Green (20)
| Chris Andersen (7)
| Jordan Farmar (5)
| AT&T Center18,418
| 41–32
|- style="background:#fbb;"
| 74
| March 28
| San Antonio
| 
| Vince Carter (14)
| Matt Barnes (9)
| Ray McCallum (4)
| FedExForum17,133
| 41–33
|- style="background:#fbb;"
| 75
| March 30
| Denver
| 
| Zach Randolph (26)
| JaMychal Green (12)
| Jordan Farmar (5)
| FedExForum16,401
| 41–34

|- style="background:#fbb;"
| 76
| April 1
| Toronto
| 
| Zach Randolph (26)
| JaMychal Green (7) 
| Lance Stephenson (4)
| FedExForum17,077
| 41–35
|- style="background:#fbb;"
| 77
| April 3
| @ Orlando
| 
| Matt Barnes (24)
| JaMychal Green (10)
| Zach Randolph (7)
| Amway Center17,741
| 41–36
|- style="background:#bfb;"
| 78
| April 5
| Chicago
| 
| Zach Randolph (27)
| Zach Randolph (10)
| Vince Carter (4)
| FedExForum17,591
| 42–36
|- style="background:#fbb;"
| 79
| April 8
| @ Dallas
| 
| Tony Allen (25)
| Andersen, Barnes, Stephenson (7)
| Allen, Barnes (5)
| American Airlines Center20,211
| 42–37
|- style="background:#fbb;"
| 80
| April 9
| Golden State
| 
| Matt Barnes (24)
| Matt Barnes (15)
| Vince Carter (4)
| FedExForum19,257
| 42–38
|- style="background:#fbb;"
| 81
| April 12
| @ L. A. Clippers
| 
| Zach Randolph (14)
| JaMychal Green (10)
| Xavier Munford (4)
| Staples Center19,147
| 42–39
|-style="background:#fbb;"
| 82
| April 13
| @ Golden State
| 
| Zach Randolph (24)
| Matt Barnes (9)
| Matt Barnes (6)
| Oracle Arena19,596
| 42–40

Standings

By Conference

Playoffs

Game log

|- style="background:#fbb;"
| 1
| April 17
| @ San Antonio
| 
| Vince Carter (16)
| Chris Andersen (9)
| Xavier Munford (4)
| AT&T Center18,418
| 0–1
|- style="background:#fbb;"
| 2
| April 19
| @ San Antonio
| 
| Tony Allen (12)
| Zach Randolph (12)
| Zach Randolph (3)
| AT&T Center18,418
| 0–2
|- style="background:#fbb;"
| 3
| April 22
| San Antonio
| 
| Zach Randolph (20)
| Barnes, Randolph (11)
| Jordan Farmar (6)
| FedExForum18,119
| 0–3
|- style="background:#fbb;"
| 4
| April 24
| San Antonio
| 
| Lance Stephenson (26)
| Barnes, Randolph (7)
| Jordan Farmar (5)
| FedExForum18,119
| 0–4

References

External links

Memphis Grizzlies seasons
Memphis Grizzlies
Memphis Grizzlies
Memphis Grizzlies
Events in Memphis, Tennessee